Statistics of the Scottish Football League in season 2007–08.

Scottish First Division

Scottish Second Division

Scottish Third Division

See also
2007–08 in Scottish football

References

 
Scottish Football League seasons